Marius Danielsen's Legend of Valley Doom Part 2 is the second full-length album by Marius Danielsen's project Legend of Valley Doom. It is a concept album and a rock opera featuring many guest musicians. The plot of the album continues the story started on Legend of Valley Doom Part 1. It was released on 30 November 2018, with cover art credited to Dusan Markovic.

Track listing

Credits 
 Marius Danielsen (Darkest Sins) – Vocals, Guitars
 Stian Kristoffersen (Pagan's Mind) – Drums
 Peter Danielsen (Darkest Sins) – Keyboards

Guests

Musicians 
 Guitar
Bruce Kulick (ex-Kiss) – track 11
Matias Kupiainen (Stratovarius) – track 2
Jennifer Batten (ex-Michael Jackson) – track 8
Tracy G (ex-Dio) – track 6
Jens Ludwig (Edguy) – track 7
Tom Naumann (Primal Fear) – track 4
Jimmy Hedlund (Falconer) – tracks 7, 9
Timo Somers (Delain) – track 9
Olivier Lapauze (Heavenly) – track 9
Luca Princiotta (Doro) – track 10
Andy Midgley (Neonfly) – track 5
Mike Campese – track 9
Billy Johnston (Beecake) – track 8
Sigurd Kårstad (Darkest Sins) – track 2
 Bass
Jari Kainulainen (ex-Stratovarius, Masterplan) – tracks 5, 6, 10
Barend Courbois (Blind Guardian) – track 9
Magnus Rosén (ex-HammerFall) – track 7
Jonas Kuhlberg (Cain's Offering) – track 2
Giorgio Novarino (ex-Bejelit) – tracks 1, 3, 4, 11 12
Rick Martin (Beecake) – track 8
 Keyboards
 Steve Williams (Power Quest) – track 11

Singers 
Marius Danielsen (Darkest Sins) – tracks 2, 3, 5, 10 & 12 
Michael Kiske (Helloween, Unisonic) – tracks 1 & 9
Blaze Bayley (ex-Iron Maiden, Wolvesbane) – track 7
Tim Owens (ex-Judas Priest, ex-Iced Earth) – track 12
Mark Boals (ex-Yngwie Malmsteen, ex-Royal Hunt) – track 2
Daniel Heiman (ex-Lost Horizon, Heed) – tracks 1, 9 & 11
Michele Luppi (Whitesnake, ex-Vision Divine) – track 11
Olaf Hayer (ex-Luca Turilli, Symphonity) – track 10
Mathias Blad (Falconer) – track 4
Alessio Garavello (ex-Power Quest, A New Tomorrow) – tracks 3 & 5
Jan Thore Grefstad (Highland Glory, Saint Deamon) – track 8
 (Iron Mask) – track 6
Raphael Mendes (Urizen) – track 6
Per Johansson (Ureas) – track 7
Anniken Rasmussen (Darkest Sins) – track 10
Peter Danielsen (Darkest Sins) – track 3

References

External links
 Marius Danielsen official website
 Crime Records official website

Rock operas
Concept albums